The following is a list of electricity generating facilities within South Africa that are not operating. have been decommissioned or were notable power stations in the past.

See also
List of power stations in South Africa

References

 Decomm